The Őszöd speech was a speech Hungarian Prime Minister Ferenc Gyurcsány delivered to the 2006 Hungarian Socialist Party (MSZP) congress in Balatonőszöd. Though the May congress was confidential, Gyurcsány's address was leaked and broadcast by Magyar Rádió on Sunday, 17 September 2006, igniting a nationwide political crisis.

Liberally using vulgar language, Gyurcsány criticized the MSZP for misleading the electorate and said that its coalition government had enacted no significant measures over its tenure. The mass protests the speech's release precipitated are considered a major turning point in Hungary's post-communist political history. MSZP's inability to contain the speech's political fallout led to the popular collapse of MSZP and, more broadly considered, of the Hungarian political left, paving the way for Fidesz's supermajority victory in the 2010 Hungarian parliamentary elections.

Excerpts from the speech with their translations

Profane excerpts 
Not only the content but also the profanity of the speech has been heavily criticized. In response to the criticism concerning the profanity, Ferenc Gyurcsány stated that "these words were the words of objurgation, passion and love" ("").

While giving the speech, he used – among others – the Hungarian word szar (i.e., shit) or its related terms (etc.) eight times and the word  (i.e., bitch, whorish, fucking) seven times. The following table presents some of the profane remarks – of which not everything has been translated by the foreign (i.e., non-Hungarian) press in general – with their corresponding translations. Although 'fucking country' is the best idiomatic translation because of the strength of the words, kurva ország literally means 'whore country', and the connotations of immorality, unprincipled pursuit of money and therefore corruption are very strong in Hungarian.

Other excerpts 
Viktor Orbán, then-chairman of Fidesz, called Ferenc Gyurcsány "a compulsive liar" ("") whom his party considers as "a person who is a part of history and the past" ("").
In addition to the excerpts above, the following table contains excerpts from the speech for which Ferenc Gyurcsány has received heavy criticism.

See also 
 2006 protests in Hungary
 Ferenc Gyurcsány
 Elk*rtuk

References 

 A teljes balatonőszödi szöveg (The whole text from the Balatonőszöd speech. In Hungarian): http://nol.hu/cikk/417593/
 The speech in mp3 format: http://dl.index.hu/dl/sziget/fleto/oszod5.mp3
 The speech on the blog of Ferenc Gyurcsány (Hungarian) - http://kapcsolat.hu/blog/jojjon_az_eredeti_szoveg...
 Ferenc Gyurcsány: "These words were the words of objurgation, passion and love". ("Ezek a korholás, a szenvedély és a szeretet szavai voltak", Hungarian) - http://www.icenter.hu/cgi-bin/automatic/bianko.pl?szo=4800&cikk=0609285045007
 Viktor Orbán: "This person [i.e. Ferenc Gyurcsány] is a sick liar." ("Ez egy beteges hazudozó.", Hungarian) - http://www.mno.hu/index.mno?cikk=375107&rvt=2
 Fidesz - Hungarian Civic Union considers Ferenc Gyurcsány as "a person who is a part of history and the past". ("a történelemhez és a múlthoz tartozó személy", Hungarian) - http://index.hu/politika/belfold/ov0821/
 English translation by BBC - http://news.bbc.co.uk/2/hi/europe/5359546.stm
 English report as seen on BBC - https://www.youtube.com/watch?v=7kh5TsREt4A

2006 in Hungarian politics
2006 speeches
Political scandals in Hungary
Ferenc Gyurcsány